The Rochedale Busway Station is a proposed Busway Station to be built in Queensland Australia at Rochedale near Underwood Road as part of an extension to the South East Busway, planned to be completed in 2024. The station will be served by TransLink bus routes. It will be the station between the existing Eight Mile Plains Station (currently the last station on the South East Busway) and Springwood Bus Station.

Proposed Facilities 
The Rochedale Busway Station was previously proposed in 2007 to include:
 a Park'n'Ride facility with approximately 750 car-parking spaces;
 bus turnaround facilities and access to allow entry/exit to the Busway by local bus routes;
 other mixed-use development.

As part of the upgrade of the Pacific Motorway between Eight Mile Plains and Daisy Hill, the South East Busway will be extended to Springwood bus station, and Rochedale busway station will also be constructed. However, the park 'n' ride facility was changed to have a capacity of more than 400 vehicles.

, the busway station is in the detailed design phase. The Pacific Highway upgrade and the busway station is expected to be completed in 2024.

References

External links
 South East Busway Extension Project - Department of Transport and Main Roads
 Gateway Upgrade South (GUS) Project - Department of Transport and Main Roads

Bus stations in Brisbane
Proposed public transport in Australia